Mariakani  is a town in Kenya lying on the boundary of Kaloleni and Kinango districts (formerly Kilifi and Kwale respectively) in the old Coast Province of Kenya, 36 kilometres northwest of the port city of Mombasa.

Administration during colonial period
The administrative areas which make up Mariakani today were shared by the Durumas, Chonyi, Giriamas and Kambas. The British colonists considered it more prudent to administer the dominant ethnic groups separately. The Kilifi county side had a Giriama and Kamba Chief to take care of the interest of the two ethnic groups, whereas on the Kwale County side, i.e. the Mwavumbo area,  was another pair of chiefs to represent the Duruma and Kamba people. The last of these chiefs were the late Chief Johnson Mwero Mwaiga from Matumbi and Ex-Senior Chief Nzana wa Mumo from Gwasheni. From the 1960s onwards and especially after Kenya achieved independence, the practice was discontinued to give way to one chief for the entire area. The first chief of the area in Mwavumbo was Mkalla Mwero from Matumbi.

Today  
The boundary between the two Counties has changed since the colonial times but nowadays there is the Railway line from Mazeras Town to Maji ya Chumvi.  The origin of the centre is set in the 15th Century during the long-distance trade. The traders from Ukambani threw away their weaponry at this spot as a peace sign when approaching Mombasa as the Sultan of that time did not allow traders to enter the island with any kind of weaponry. "Riaka" (Mariaka in plural is Durumas word for quiver; Mariakani translates as the place of quivers in Duruma language. The Giriama word for quiver is similar to the Kamba: Thyaka though it may be spelled slightly different. The Kamba call Quiver "Thyaka" (singular) hence the town is also called "Mathyakani" when speaking in Kigiriama or Kikamba. Most of the business activities are done on the Kaloleni side owing to the shift of transport preference to Mombasa-Nairobi Highway rather than the rail line and station. However, earlier business and development endeavours were done jointly by both side of the boundary. These include the Mariakani High school, the Kwale-Kilifi Milk Scheme Cooperative of the 1960s, slaughter houses among others.

The Kwale County side is part of Mwavumbo area and is not widely known. Its population is dominantly Durumas and Coastal Kambas, the descendants of the explorers' scouts and long-distance traders.

Mariakani (Kilifi county side) hosts a town council with a population of 67,984, of whom 10,987 are classified urban (1999 census ). The town council consists of five wards: Kaliangombe, Kawala, Mariakani, Mugumo-wa-Patsa, Tsangatsini. All of them are located within Kaloleni Constituency. Central Mariakani is located in Mariakani location of Kaloleni division of Kilifi district.

From at least 2019, 21 Kenya Rifles (Kenya Army Infantry) has been located at Mariakani Barracks, reporting to 6 Brigade at Garissa.

Transport 
Mariakani has a station on the Kenyan Railway system.

Elevation = Altitude.nu

See also 
 Railway stations in Kenya
 Transport in Kenya

References 

Populated places in Coast Province